David Frank Victor Johns (27 June 1921 – 20 November 1979) was an English cricketer.  Johns was a left-handed batsman who bowled slow left-arm orthodox.  He was born in Paddington, London.

Johns made his debut for Buckinghamshire in the 1950 Minor Counties Championship against Hertfordshire. Johns played Minor counties cricket for Buckinghamshire from 1950 to 1966, which included 83 Minor Counties Championship matches. In 1952, when Buckinghamshire won the championship, Johns scored 846 runs at an average of 70.50 and took 39 wickets at 14.02. That season he set a record for the highest score for the county when he made 191 against Bedfordshire.

He made his only List A appearance for Buckinghamshire against Middlesex in the 1965 Gillette Cup.  He made 19 runs before being dismissed by Ron Hooker.

Johns played a single first-class match for a combined Minor Counties team in 1953 against the touring Australians. He took his only first-class wicket in the Australians' first innings, that of Don Tallon, for the cost of 55 runs from 13 overs.  With the bat he was dismissed for a duck in the Minor Counties first innings by Ray Lindwall, and in the second innings he scored 4 runs before being dismissed by Ron Archer.

He died in High Wycombe, Buckinghamshire on 20 November 1979.

References

External links
 
David Johns at CricketArchive

1921 births
1979 deaths
People from Paddington
Cricketers from Greater London
English cricketers
Buckinghamshire cricketers
Buckinghamshire cricket captains
Minor Counties cricketers